Flostaøya is an island in Arendal municipality in Agder county, Norway. The  island lies along the Skaggerak coast between the islands of Tromøy to the southwest and Tverrdalsøya to the northeast. Some of the larger villages on the island include Arnevik, Narestø, and Kalvøysund. The island has a bridge connection to the mainland at the southwest corner of the island and there is a bridge connection to Kilsund on the neighboring island of Tverrdalsøya at the north end.

The island was historically part of the municipality of Dypvåg until 1902.  In 1902, the island (along with Tverrdalsøya and part of the mainland) became a part of the new municipality of Flosta.  In 1962, the island became a part of the new municipality of Moland, but that only lasted until 1992 when the island was merged into the municipality of Arendal.  The historic Flosta Church is located just north of Narestø on the island of Flostaøya.

Media gallery

See also
List of islands of Norway

References

Arendal
Islands of Agder